This page is a listing of federal and provincial electoral districts located in the City of Vancouver, British Columbia, and for ridings which include the name Vancouver in their title, including those on Vancouver Island among which was the original first-use of the riding-name Vancouver. For ridings in any of the suburbs other than North Vancouver and West Vancouver, please see New Westminster (electoral districts) (all other Lower Mainland ridings are descendants of the original New Westminster riding. Vancouver Island ridings not including the name "Vancouver" can be found at Vancouver Island (electoral districts).

Current federal electoral districts

In Vancouver:

 Vancouver Centre (1914–present)
 Vancouver East (1933–present)
 Vancouver Granville (2013–present)
 Vancouver Kingsway (1952–1987), (1996–present)
 Vancouver Quadra (1947–present)
 Vancouver South (1914–1996), (2003–present)

Not in the City of Vancouver:
 West Vancouver—Sunshine Coast—Sea to Sky Country (2004–present)
 North Vancouver (1987–present)

Defunct federal electoral districts
In Vancouver:
 Burrard (1892–1903): Included coastal and Valley areas assigned to Comox—Atlin and Yale—Cariboo in 1903, at which the urban area riding was named Vancouver City. Burrard was restored from 1914 to 1924 as a riding, covering the Burrard Inlet-side wards of the city of Vancouver (excluding downtown) and the North Shore communities, Squamish and Coquitlam. It was succeeded by:
 Vancouver—Burrard (1924–1966)

In addition to Vancouver—Burrard, other urban ridings were:

 Vancouver City (1903–1914)
 Burnaby–Kingsway (1987–1996)
 Vancouver South—Burnaby (1996–2003)

Not in the City of Vancouver:
 Vancouver Island (1871–1872)
 Vancouver (1872–1903): This riding was the successor to the Vancouver Island riding, and did not include the site of the city of Vancouver (which was not named until 1885 to 1886). From 1892, the city of Vancouver riding was Burrard, which had been, from 1872 to 1892, a part of New Westminster.
 Vancouver North, British Columbia (1924–1947): Included the North Shore and also much of the rural area north to Pemberton and the Sunshine Coast. Between 1935 and 1947, it also included northern Burnaby and the Tri-Cities.
 North Vancouver—Burnaby, British Columbia (1976–1987)
 West Vancouver—Sunshine Coast (1996–2004)
 Vancouver Island North (1996–2013)

Current provincial electoral districts

Vancouver City
 Vancouver-Fairview
 Vancouver-False Creek
 Vancouver-Fraserview
 Vancouver-Hastings
 Vancouver-Kensington
 Vancouver-Kingsway
 Vancouver-Langara
 Vancouver-Mount Pleasant
 Vancouver-Point Grey
 Vancouver-Quilchena
 Vancouver-West End

North Shore
North Vancouver-Lonsdale, since 1991
North Vancouver-Seymour, since 1966
West Vancouver-Capilano, since 1991
West Vancouver-Sea to Sky, since 2009

Defunct provincial electoral districts

Vancouver City
 Vancouver-Burrard, 1933–2005
All of the following were multiple member ridings until 1991
 Vancouver City, 1890–1928
 South Vancouver, 1916–1928
 Vancouver East, 1933–1986
 Vancouver Centre, 1933–1986
 Vancouver-Little Mountain, 1966–1996
 Vancouver South, 1966–1986

North Shore
 North Vancouver, 1916–1963
 North Vancouver-Capilano, 1966–1986
 West Vancouver-Howe Sound, 1966–1986
 West Vancouver–Garibaldi, 1991–2005

Vancouver Island

References

Electoral History of BC, BC Elections

British Columbia electoral districts
Electoral districts
 list
British Columbia politics-related lists
Electoral districts